Scarlet Spider is the title of two comic book series published by Marvel Comics about two clones of Spider-Man while they functioned as the then-current version of the Scarlet Spider. The first volume lasted only two issues as a brief temporary replacement of the Spider-Man series and was published in 1995. The second volume started publishing in January 2012 and ended in December 2013 with issue 25 after a total of 26 issues, because there was a special Marvel Point One issue published between issues 12 and 13.

Volume 1
The first volume starred Ben Reilly as the Scarlet Spider. It was published for two issues in November and December 1995 in between Spider-Man issues 63 and 64. During this time, the four primary Spider-Man series and his quarterly series and were paused and briefly replaced by Scarlet Spider counterparts; the others being Web of Scarlet Spider, The Amazing Scarlet Spider, The Spectacular Scarlet Spider, and Scarlet Spider Unlimited.

The five series were instituted as part of the Clone Saga after when Peter Parker gave up being Spider-Man to retire with his pregnant wife Mary Jane, and the Scarlet Spider took on his duties. Spider-Man (along with Amazing, Spectacular and Unlimited) returned to its old name and numbering when Ben Reilly left the Scarlet Spider identity behind and took on the Spider-Man name for himself.

The Scarlet Spider books were direct continuations, in terms of creative teams and story lines, of the their Spider-Man counterparts. They were effectively temporary renamings of their counterparts, other than not being incorporated into their issue numbering. The writer of the two issues was Howard Mackie and the pencillers were Gil Kane and John Romita Jr.

Volume 2

On July 22, 2011, during the San Diego Comic-Con, Marvel released an image to the audience depicting a burnt sweater of the original Scarlet Spider. This led many readers to assume that Ben Reilly would be returning and taking on the mantle of Scarlet Spider once again. However, through introduction of the Marvel Now event, Marvel Point One showed readers that Kaine Parker would be the main character in the new Scarlet Spider series.

Ryan Stegman, the series' penciller states that volume 2 is set to be of a darker tone than The Amazing Spider-Man series. Stegman also states that the new Scarlet Spider is meant to be a grittier and scarier version of the original Spider-Man. The writer of the series, Christopher Yost, states that Kaine would be moved to Houston, Texas due to characters in New York knowing that he was a villain in his former life, and that Kaine needed a fresh start. Yost also states that due to the brand new location of Houston in a Spider-Man comic book, several new villains would be introduced in the Marvel world as well as a brand new supporting cast. Yost stated that the Scarlet Spider series would be a story about a former super-villain who is finding himself and is on the pursuit of a journey of self-discovery.

The second volume stars Peter Parker's first genetic clone, Kaine as the Scarlet Spider. After helping to stop Spider-Island, Kaine has been cured of his clonal degeneration. While fleeing to Mexico he stops in Houston to steal money from criminals, but ends up becoming the superhero, Scarlet Spider.

The first issue sold over 50,000 copies, but sales dropped to an average of about 22,000 copies being sold per issue by July 2013. The series introduces several new characters in the Marvel world, such as Aracely Penalba (the demigod superhero known as Hummingbird), Dr. Donald Meland and his husband Wally Layton. The character Annabelle Adams is also introduced in the Marvel world as a love interest for Kaine. The characters play pivotal roles in the growth of Kaine as a superhero.

On July 6, 2012 Marvel teased readers with the submission of an article displaying a logo titled Minimum Carnage, and that more information would be released soon. The 2012 San Diego Comic-Con revealed that the Scarlet Spider series along with the Venom series, would be collaborating for the Marvel event, Minimum Carnage.

On May 10, 2013, Christopher Yost revealed his plans of Scarlet Spider and the Superior Spider-Man meeting for the first time in Superior Spider-Man Team-Up issue #2, in a Marvel arc titled 'Sibling Rivalry'. Scarlet Spider's and Superior Spider-Man's meeting is said to collaborate with the Scarlet Spider and Superior Spider-Man Team Up series'.

Volume Three
Following the events of the 2016 Spider-Man event The Clone Conspiracy, Ben Reilly was brought back after a twenty year absence, and a new Scarlet Spider title written by Peter David was launched. The title ran for 25 issues before folding in late 2018.

Collected editions

References

External links
The Marvel Chronology Project
The Unofficial Handbook of Marvel Comics Creators

Comics by Christopher Yost
Comics by Peter David
Spider-Man titles
1995 comics debuts
2012 comics debuts